Huta Pass (elevation ) is a pass in the Oaș Mountains of the Inner Eastern Carpathians in northern Romania. The pass connects the counties of Maramureș and Satu Mare. 

The Huta Pass is traversed by national road , which starts in Sighetu Marmației,  to the east, continues over the pass, and then descends to Negrești-Oaș,  to the southwest.

References

External links

Mountain passes of Romania